Evangelia (Lina) Nikolakopoulou (Λίνα Νικολακοπούλου) is widely recognised as one of the foremost lyricists in Greece. She was born in Methana on 30 June 1958 and studied social and political sciences at the Panteion University in Athens. This is where she met the composer Stamatis Kraounakis, with whom she has made several records. Kukloforo kai Oploforo by Alkistis Protopsalti, Mama Gernao by Tania Tsanaklidou, Meno Ektos by Eleftheria Arvanitaki, Kratai chronia afti i kolognia (1990) composed by Thanos Mikroutsikos and sung by Haris Alexiou, Di Efchon (1992) composed by Nikos Antypas and sung by Haris Alexiou and many others are only some of the records that she has participated in.

In 2007, she made the record Dama Coupe with Dimitra Galani. In 2008, she took a quite new band Trifono (three voices) and made a record with them.

References

Living people
1958 births
Greek women songwriters
Greek lyricists
People from Troizinia-Methana